Sir Brian Stapylton, 2nd Baronet (c. 1657 – 23 November 1727), of Myton Hall in Yorkshire, was an English Tory politician who sat in the English and British House of Commons between 1679 and 1715
 
Stapylton was the eldest son of Sir Henry Stapylton and his wife Elizabeth Darcy, daughter of Conyers Darcy, 1st Earl of Holderness, of Hornby Castle, Yorkshire. His father had been a Member of Parliament during the Commonwealth and was created a baronet shortly after the Restoration in 1660. Stapylton matriculated at Christ Church, Oxford on 3 November 1674, aged 17, and was awarded BA in 1677. He succeeded to the baronetcy and Myton Hall following his father's death on 26 March 1679.

Stapylton was returned as Member of Parliament for Aldborough on the Wentworth interest at the second general election of 1679. He was inactive in the second Exclusion Parliament, and did not stand again until after the Revolution. He married Anne Kaye, daughter of Sir John Kaye, 2nd Baronet of Woodsome on 15 April 1680. In 1683, he became JP for West Yorkshire and served as High Sheriff of Yorkshire for the year 1683 to 1684. He became Deputy Lieutenant of Yorkshire in 1685. In 1688 he was removed from his local offices as JP and DL, but was re-instated in 1689.

At the 1690 English general election, Stapylton was returned as MP for Boroughbridge, which had been his father's seat. He was returned again until the 1715 British general election.

Stapylton died on 23 November 1727. He and his wife had three children:
 John Stapylton (c. 1683 – 1733) 
 Anne Stapylton
 Elizabeth

Stapylton was succeeded in the baronetcy by his son John

Stapylton's surname is sometimes spelt Stapleton, and some documents spell his first name as Bryan.

References

 http://www.william1.co.uk/w142.htm

|-

1650s births
1727 deaths
People from Hambleton District
Stapylton, Brian, 2nd Baronet
Alumni of Christ Church, Oxford
English MPs 1679
English MPs 1680–1681
English MPs 1690–1695
English MPs 1695–1698
English MPs 1698–1700
English MPs 1701
English MPs 1701–1702
English MPs 1702–1705
Members of the Parliament of Great Britain for English constituencies
British MPs 1708–1710
British MPs 1710–1713
High Sheriffs of Yorkshire
Members of the Parliament of England for constituencies in Yorkshire